Mujib: The Making of a Nation is an upcoming Indian-Bangladeshi co-produced Bengali-language biographical film directed by Shyam Benegal. It stars Arifin Shuvoo as Sheikh Mujibur Rahman, the first president of Bangladesh and father of the nation, popularly known as Bangabandhu, who was assassinated with his family during coup d'état in 1975. This is the first government produced biopic about him.

The film was produced on the occasion of Mujib Year.  Arifin Shuvoo, Nusrat Imrose Tisha and Zayed Khan has taken only  as remuneration for acting in this film. The film was scheduled to start production on 18 March 2020, a day after Bangabandhu's birth centenary. But it was delayed due to the COVID-19 pandemic.

Shyam Benegal said that he was happy to direct the film and praised Bangabandhu who was a friend of India. Commenting on the film, Bangabandhu's daughter, Prime Minister Sheikh Hasina, was optimistic about the film. Directed by Shyam Benegal, the film will be accepted as a milestone in the Bangladeshi cinema history, she said positively.

Its art director is Nitish Roy. Pia Benegal is responsible for costume of the film as costume director. Dayal Nihalani is the associate Director. Its screenplay was done by Atul Tiwari and Shama Zaidi. Its executive producer is Nujhat Yasmin. Its line producer is Mohammad Hossain Jaimy. Its dialogue writer, script supervisor, and dialogue coach is Sadhana Ahmed. Its casting director is Shyam Rawat and Baharuddin Khelon.

Cast

Production

Background

Until 2016, many people wanted to make a film based on the life story of Bangabandhu, but their initiative was not successful. Even before the production of this film, there was a demand to make a biographical film of Bangabandhu as a state initiative. Actor Raj from East Pakistan announced to make a film about him titled Bangabandhu in 1970. In an interview given to the weekly Chitrali in 1988, Farooque revealed his plan to make a film about Mujib. It was reported by India Today in 2008 that Abdul Gaffar Chowdhury planned to make a film about Bangabandhu titled The Poet of Politics. It was rumored that it would be directed by Shyam Benegal and Amitabh Bachchan would be cast as the main character in the film. However, the film was not made. In 2010, Vibgyor Films had planned to make a film about Bangabandhu in Hollywood. It was learned that the shooting of the film was scheduled to start in 2011. Giasuddin Selim wanted to make a film based on The Unfinished Memoirs, an autobiography book of Mujib, but he backed out due to lack of budget. On 3 December, 2015, the then Minister of Cultural Affairs named Asaduzzaman Noor officially announced the Hasina government desire to make a biopic of Sheikh Mujibur Rahman. He also said that his ministry has discussed the matter with the Prime Minister and she has given the green signal. Later, Narendra Modi, the Indian prime minister, proposed to the Bangladeshi prime minister named Sheikh Hasina the concept of a film on the life of her father. His proposal was liked by her. On 17 August 2016, Venkaiah Naidu, the then information minister of India, declared the acceptance of the proposal to assist the production of the biographical film of Bangabandhu by Hasanul Haq Inu. On 8 April 2017, in the presence of Sheikh Hasina at the Hyderabad House in New Delhi, Narendra Modi officially announced the joint-production of the film.

Development

On 27 August 2017, an agreement was signed between the Government of Bangladesh and India in the capital of India. One of the purposes of the agreement was to make a film on Bangabandhu. In 18 March 2018, the Government of Bangladesh announced that the preliminary work of making the film would start from that year. A film committee was formed with 19 people from Bangladesh and India to implement the film project. The coordinator of the committee was the additional secretary of the Ministry of Information of Bangladesh. Hasanul Haq Inu organized several meetings regarding Bangabandhu's biopic during his tenure as Information Minister. Film directors and experts participating in the meetings gave their opinion in favor of directing the film by any director of the country. So it was initially decided that the film would be directed by Nasiruddin Yousuff. But the film committee chose Shyam Benegal as the director when three directors from India were nominated in July, 2018. to direct the film Shyam Benegal accepted the offer to direct the film as he felt that the main character of the film was an interesting character in his time. On 27 August 2018, Tarana Halim officially announced his name as the director of the film on behalf of the Government of Bangladesh. In 2019, it was announced that a three-member expert team from Bangladesh would be formed to assist the film's director. It was decided that the team would include a historian, an acquaintance of Mujib and an experienced film personality. On 1 April 2019, Shyam Benegal visited Bangladesh to discuss the film project with Sheikh Hasina and film associates. Bangladesh has given  of the budget and India has given . After the Bangladesh delegation visited India on 7 May 2019 and discussed with the Indians, the matter of making the film was finalized. On 6 October 2019, the director talked with Sheikh Hasina in a meeting at New Delhi for the film. Later another film related agreement was finalised in 14 January 2020. Shyam Benegal further said that this is a Bengali nationalist film. Sheikh Hasina wanted the language of the film to be in English or Hindustani or Urdu. But Shyam Benegal decided to make the film in Bengali, the state language of Bangladesh. Benegal doesn’t know Bengali, for this reason he had to enlist the help of translators. Two years later its official title was announced. The director gave the name to the film as the meaning of Mujib is significant.

Character
Character development of Sheikh Mujibur Rahman was a difficult task for Benegal. As steadfast as Mujib was to his political ideals and movements, he gave importance to his family And he was more of a family man than all the important personalities of the Indian subcontinent. And so his life is presented in this film from an emotional point of view. The director said that Mujib will be portrayed in a balanced manner in the film.

Writing
Atul Tiwari planned to visit Bangladesh in May 2019 as part of his film research. Piplu Khan was his helper and research related assistant. Atul Tiwari visited Bangladesh with Shama Zaidi on 19 May and investigated the biopic related historical places. As part of the research for the film, Sheikh Hasina assisted the director with information about her father's life. Although the film script was reviewed by her, she did not demand any major change in the script. In order to complete the screenplay, Shama Zaidi and Atul Tiwari adhered to research paper on the main character of the film written by Gowher Rizvi. As part of the research, the screenwriters collected information from people associated with Bangabandhu. A scriptwriters' committee was formed to write the script for the film. Anam Biswas, Gias Uddin Selim, Shihab Shaheen and Sadhana Ahmed were selected as members of this committee. Asaduzzaman Noor assisted the members as an advisor to the committee. From February to August 2020, many minor corrections was made to the screenplay of the film.

Casting

Shyam Benegal ensured that most of the performers in the film were from Bangladesh. Auditions were held in Bangladesh and India from January to February 2020 for the casting of the film. Apart from various performers, Soumya Jyoti, Tariq Anam Khan, Shamima Nazneen, Masuma Rahman Nabila, Jaya Ahsan and Kaushik Sen were also present at the auditions. According to a report in the Bangla Tribune on 7 February 2020, Dilara Zaman has been finalized as the cast of the film in January. Besides, the names of Fazlur Rahman Babu and Tauquir Ahmed have also been finalized, says the report. A draft list of castings for the film contain 50 actors was made in 4 March 2020. According to a report by Bangla Tribune, Sheikh Hasina's wishes would prevail in selecting actor for the lead role in the film. Her choice for the role was Amitabh Bachchan. But in the pre-production, she couldn’t prefer him because Bachchan was older in that time. The director said that he was looking for a slim actor for the main character Sheikh Mujibur Rahman because he was not fat in his early life. Arifin Shuvoo was one of the 15 actors selected for the role of Bangabandhu who was finalized after 5 rounds of auditions. In an interview, the director explained why Arifin Shuvo was cast as the main character, saying that he was the perfect person for the role. Although it was decided to cast Jyotika Jyoti and Jannatul Sumaiya Himi as Sheikh Fazilatunnesa Mujib and Sheikh Hasina in the qualifying round, they were later dropped. Rawnak Hasan was selected for acting as Sheikh Kamal and was later dropped in the day of his contract signing day because the director thought that he wasn’t perfect for the role. He was replaced by Somnath Chatterjee in December 2020. Although Ferdous Ahmed was finalised for Tajuddin Ahmad's role, Riaz was later hired to play the role for visa related issue. The production team was supposed to sign the contract with the selected actors in March 2021, but due to the inability to start shooting, it was decided in September. After the first round of casting, the second round of casting is done online due to the COVID-19 pandemic. In the next step, casting director Baharuddin Khelon selected 60 people for acting and sent their names to the director. Benegal finalized their names from the list after discussion. Irfan Sajjad was finalized for the role of Moazzem Hossain on 17 November 2021. Then on 22 November, Zayed Khan signed the contract for the role of Tikka Khan.

Costume
In December 2019, the production team reached out to costume designers in Bangladesh as well as clothing stores in the country to get an idea of the costumes. The costume designer of the film is Pia Benegal. The costumes for the film have been made in multiple costume factory in Mumbai Film City. For the film, research has been done on Sheikh Mujibur Rahman's costume and especially Mujib coat. According to Pia Benegal, the idea of Mujib coat as a costume was extraordinary and convenient, the collar of which could be easily changed.

Filming
The shooting of the film was originally scheduled to start before 2018 Bangladeshi general election. Then the date was shifted to November 2019. On 7 May 2019, the director stated his team's desire to complete its filming in 80 days. Later the date was changed to 18 March 2020, but suspended. As per the initial plan, indoor shooting of the film was to be done in Kolkata and outdoor shooting in Bangladesh. The film's shooting started with muhurat shot under the working title Bangabandhu: The Making of a Nation on 21 January 2021, in India. The first phase of the shooting was planned to be completed in the country within 100 days and it was completed on 4 April, 2021. It was informed that the scenes of the liberation war would be shot in the second phase. The shooting of the film had to be postponed many times due to the COVID-19 lockdown in India and Cyclone Tauktae and Yaas. From 20 November, several scenes of the film were shot in many places of Bangladesh as well. The shooting for 7 March Speech of Bangabandhu scenes took place on 23 November 2021 at the football field of Dhaka College. On 4 December 2021, a scene of the Bengali language movement was captured at Madhur Canteen. The shooting of the second phase ended after 59 days. As of April 2022, it is known that A total of 960 minutes were recorded as draft footage. According to a report of Samakal on 11 September 2022, the production team is thinking of re-shooting some scenes.

Editing and visual effects
In March 2022, it was reported by Prothom Alo that post-production of the film had already begun. It was planned to do the post-production in Mumbai. Benegal stated that post-production is likely to be completed by June, 2022. The editing of the film was supervised by a team from Bangladeshi government. However, due to the trailer controversy in May 2022, the production team started re-editing the footages of the film. Bangladeshi film experts will be consulted after editing the film on the advice of the supervising team. If they do not object, the film will be released only after showing it to Sheikh Hasina. According to a report of Samakal on 11 September 2022, Makuta VFX was appointed for visual effects of the film. On 12 September 2022, Hasan Mahmud stated that the film is ready for release.

Music
In 2021, the production team contacted Zahid Akbar to compose the only song for the film. The song was named Ochin Majhi whose composer and singer was Shantanu Moitra, the music director of the film. It is the first music sang by him for any film.

Influence
There was a lot of interest among Bangladeshis to know who will play the main character in the film. Some people proposed Amitabh Bachchan, Nawazuddin Siddiqui, Boman Irani, Adil Hussain, Prosenjit Chatterjee, Pijush Bandyopadhyay and Tariq Anam Khan as main character. Some netizens edited the pictures of many actors and made their mustaches and hair look exactly like Bangabandhu and posted them on social media.

Controversies

Director

Though it was decided to make a film about Bangabandhu, the news of proposing the names of three Indian directors as the director of the film made many Bangladeshis unhappy. Some famous film related figures of Bangladesh criticized it. Among the critics were Gias Uddin Selim, Farooque, Mahmud Didar and Khizir Hayat. Nasiruddin Yousuff thinks that it would have been better if the director of the film was Bangladeshi. Abul Hayat and Toukir Ahmed were positive in this regard. However, Shyam Benegal pointed out that the biopic of Mahatma Gandhi, the father of the Indian nation, was made by a foreigner. On the other hand, Kaushik Ganguly thinks it is a simple matter because Bangabandhu is like Kazi Nazrul Islam who is the wealth of both India and Bangladesh. According to Syed Borhan Kabir, Benegal was a talented director in his early life but it is not possible for him to give any good films in this era.

Casting
Although Jannatul Sumaiya Heme's name was on the list published by BFDC, the director did not include her name on his own list. She complained that her name should not have been excluded without informing. However, Mohammad Hossain Jaimy, the line producer of the film, claimed that he did not call her because Heme's name was not in the final list given to him. Jyotika Jyoti complained on social media that although she was selected for acting twice, she was dropped due to corruption in the Bangladesh part of the production team. Jyotika Jyoti also said that when he contacted Shyam Benegal to find out why he was dropped, he informed her that since he was told that she was busy with other work, he dropped her. After the release of the trailer of the film, Shuvoo received negative response. The trailer captured his weak performance which the people of Bangladesh could not accept. As a reaction of Shuvoo's excuse for the trailer, Sohana Saba trolled him on Facebook about his performance. Columnist Deepak Chowdhury criticised the casting of Shuvoo and Tisha in the film. Columnist Syed Borhan Kabir criticized casting process of the film. In particular, he criticised Arifin Shuvoo and considered him to be only suitable for acting in romantic films.

Trailer

After the upload of the film's trailer, it got mixed reaction among the people. The trailer was criticised on many issues. Hashibur Reza Kallol, a filmmaker, criticised the trailer. But a professor in history from University of Calcutta named Kingshuk Chatterjee hinted that it is normal because even Gandhi and Jinnah couldn’t escape from criticism. Contrary to criticism of the trailer, director Shyam Benegal said that it is inappropriate to react only by watching the trailer without watching the entire film. Sohanur Rahman Sohan supported him. A section of viewers complained that there were many historical mistakes in the trailer. Scriptwriter Sadhana Ahmed refuted the allegations and told The Daily Star that there was no danger of a historical mistake in the film. Columnist Deepak Chowdhury thinks that if people watch this trailer, they may lose interest in watching the film. Jawad Antu of Somoy TV thinks that since Sheikh Mujibur Rahman is the idol of Bangladesh Awami League, a group of people in Bangladesh have unreasonably criticized its trailer, thinking it is a propaganda film of the political party. Bahauddin Khelon, one of the casting directors of the film, agreed that the trailer has some problem.

When people in Bangladesh criticized the trailer of Mujib, Arifin Shuvoo said that the trailer isn’t official. However, the country's Information Minister Hasan Mahmud denied it on May 25 and confirmed about its officiality. The director said in an interview on May 26 that the trailer was made before the film's production was completed and another trailer will be released later. He also wanted to make it clear that he is more interested in calling it a teaser than a movie trailer. He also indirectly acknowledged the flaws in the trailer.

Release

Marketing

On 19 May 2022, the trailer for the film was shown at the pavilion reserved for India in Cannes Film Festival. Viewers in the pavilion praised the film.

Theatrical release
This Bengali film is planned to be published in English and Hindi. Its original release date was 17 March 2020. Then keeping the day and month fixed, the year of its release is set back by 1 year and 2 years respectively, but was later postponed. On May 3, 2022, it was forecasted by National Film Development Corporation of India that the film would be released in September of the same year, But postponed due to the trailer controversy.

On September 6, during Sheikh Hasina's four-day state visit to India, Arindam Bagchi, the spokesperson of Indian Ministry of External Affairs, said that the film's release date has not been set but he expects it to be released by the end of 2022.

References

Notes

Citations

External links

Further reading
 
 

Films about Sheikh Mujibur Rahman
Upcoming Bengali-language films
2020s Bengali-language films
Upcoming films
Bengali-language Bangladeshi films
Bangladeshi biographical films
Indian biographical films
Bangladeshi multilingual films
Biographical films about presidents
Biographical films about revolutionaries
Epic films based on actual events
Cultural depictions of Indira Gandhi
Cultural depictions of Muhammad Ali Jinnah
Films directed by Shyam Benegal
Films with screenplays by Shama Zaidi
Films scored by Shantanu Moitra
Films shot in Mumbai
Films shot in Delhi
Films shot in Kolkata
Films shot in Dhaka
Films shot in Gazipur
Films shot in Gopalganj
Films set in the British Raj
Films set in Pakistan
Films set in Bangladesh
History of Bangladesh on film
Films set in the 20th century
Casting controversies in film
Advertising and marketing controversies in film
Film controversies in Bangladesh
Bangladesh–India relations
Bangladesh Film Development Corporation films
National Film Development Corporation of India films
Film productions suspended due to the COVID-19 pandemic
Internet memes introduced in 2022